Decentralist Party of the South (in Spanish: Partido Descentralista del Sur) was a political party in Peru. It was founded in 1931. It publishes Nuestra Tierra.

Defunct political parties in Peru
Political parties established in 1931
Political parties with year of disestablishment missing